Dabove is a surname. Notable people with the surname include: 

Diego Dabove (born 1973), Argentine football manager and player
Santiago Dabove (1889–1951), Argentine author